William Swinburne (died 1422), of Gestingthorpe and Little Horkesley, Essex, was an English politician.

Family
Swinubrne was a younger son of Sir Robert Swinburne and his second wife. He was the half-brother of Sir Thomas Swinburne. Around February 1407, he married Philippa Cergeaux, a daughter of Sir Richard Cergeaux of Cornwall.

Career
Swinburne was a Member of Parliament for Essex in November 1414.

References

Year of birth missing
1422 deaths
14th-century births
14th-century English people
English MPs November 1414
People from Braintree District
People from the Borough of Colchester